Dizin is the largest Iranian ski resort. It is located in the Alborz mountain range, about 70km North from Tehran. It was established during the 1960s under the reign of Mohammad Reza Pahlavi.

Dizin is the first ski and winter sport resort in Iran which has been officially recognized and granted the title by the International Ski Federation for its capability in administrating official and international competitions. 

The ski season in Dizin lasts from December to May, due to its high altitude. The highest ski lift reaches , making it one of the 40 highest ski resorts in the world.

Ski resort

Dizin ski amenities include hotels, cottages, restaurants, villas and private apartments. Dizin ski resort accommodates thousands of people every year. There are also other facilities such as tennis courts, mountain climbing, mountain biking. Ski instruction courses are offered. 

The resort is opened all year around offering various activities during winter and summer.

Ski area 
The ski area includes 4 gondolas, 3 chairlifts, and 9 surface lifts. The lowest point of the resort is 2650m, while its highest point is 3600m (11,811 feet above the sea level). 

The snow quality at Dizin is fantastic powder and rivals that of many European and Rocky Mountain snow areas. Dizin is 70 km North of the capital city of Tehran.

Image gallery

See also
List of ski areas and resorts in Iran
List of ski areas and resorts
Sports in Iran

References

External links
Ski Federation of Iran (contains information on Dizin)
Snowboarding and skiing in Dizin
Dizin Ski Resort - Ski of Persia

Ski areas and resorts in Iran
Sport in Alborz Province
Tourist attractions in Alborz Province
Buildings and structures in Alborz Province
1960s establishments in Iran